Artur Voskanyan (born 13 August 1976) is an Armenian football coach and former player. He is the manager of the academy of Noravank.

Club career
Artur Voskanyan began his career in Zvartnots Echmiadzin, for which he played 11 games in his first season. At that time, he was still 17 years old. Zvartnots soon had a number of unsuccessful performances and soon became SKA-Arai Echmiadzin and was demoted from the Armenian Premier League to the Armenian First League. After leaving the club, Voskanyan moved to Van Yerevan. He managed to play only two seasons for Van, as the club was disbanded after the 1996–97 season.

In 1998, Voskanyan joined Tsement Ararat. The club won the 1998 Armenian Premier League that season and also the 1998 Armenian Cup and 1998 Armenian Supercup. Voskanyan was given the Armenian Footballer of the Year award in 1998 by the Football Federation of Armenia.

International career
Voskanyan debuted in the Armenia national football team on 27 March 1999 in a home UEFA Euro 2000 qualifying match against Russia, in which the Armenian team was defeated 0:3. Over his entire time playing for the Armenian national squad, Artur had 52 matches and scored one goal in a game against the Maltese national team.

In March 2010, has been invited to the national team, for which last played a year ago. Voskanyan left the national team that same year.

Managerial career
On 8 December 2015 he has appointed as Head coach of Armenia under-17 football team.

Personal life
Artur is married and has two children, a girl and a boy. His younger brother, Ara Voskanyan, was also a football player.

National team statistics

Honours

Club
Tsement Ararat
Armenian Premier League (1): 1998
Armenian Premier League 3rd place (1): 2001
Armenian Cup (1): 1998
Armenian Supercup (1): 1998

Banants Yerevan
Armenian Premier League Runner-up (1): 2010
Armenian Premier League 3rd place (1): 2002
Armenian Cup Runner-up (2): 2009, 2010
Armenian Supercup Runner-up (1): 2010

Pyunik Yerevan
Armenian Premier League (2): 2005, 2006
Armenian Cup Runner-up (1): 2006
Armenian Supercup (1): 2005
Armenian Supercup Runner-up (1): 2006

Ararat Yerevan
Armenian Cup Runner-up (1): 2007

Individual
Armenian Footballer of the Year: 1998

References

External links
 
 
 armfootball.tripod.com
 
 

1976 births
Living people
Footballers from Yerevan
Armenian footballers
Association football midfielders
Armenia international footballers
Armenian expatriate footballers
Expatriate footballers in Russia
Expatriate footballers in Cyprus
Expatriate footballers in Belarus
Armenian Premier League players
Russian Premier League players
Cypriot First Division players
FC Elista players
FC Urartu players
Digenis Akritas Morphou FC players
Ethnikos Achna FC players
FC Pyunik players
FC Ararat Yerevan players
FC Vitebsk players
Armenian football managers
FC Urartu managers